Otto Herfurth (22 January 1893 – 29 September 1944) was a general in the Wehrmacht of Nazi Germany during World War II. He was a recipient of the Knight's Cross of the Iron Cross. Herfurth was a conspirator in the 20 July Plot.

Herfurth was the chief of staff of the III Military District which covered Berlin and Brandenburg. He initially supported the coup attempt, but later during the evening changed sides. On 14 August 1944, he was arrested and was tried by the People's Court. He was hanged on 29 September 1944 next to Joachim Meichssner, Fritz von der Lancken, Wilhelm-Friedrich zu Lynar and Joachim Sadrozinski at Plötzensee Prison in Berlin.

Awards and decorations

 Knight's Cross of the Iron Cross on 14 September 1942 as Oberst and commander of Infanterie-Regiment 117

See also
 List of members of the 20 July plot

Notes

Citations

References

1893 births
1944 deaths
Executed members of the 20 July plot
Executed military leaders
Major generals of the German Army (Wehrmacht)
People executed by hanging at Plötzensee Prison
People from the Province of Saxony
People from Wernigerode